The Gruffalo is a 2009 short computer animated television film based on the 1999 picture book written by Julia Donaldson and illustrated by Axel Scheffler.

Directed by Jakob Schuh and Max Lang, the film was produced by Michael Rose and Martin Pope of Magic Light Pictures, London, and Orange Eyes Limited, in association with the award-winning Studio Soi in Ludwigsburg, Germany, who developed and created the film.

The cast includes Helena Bonham Carter, Rob Brydon, Robbie Coltrane, James Corden, John Hurt and Tom Wilkinson.

9.8 million people watched the UK premiere on BBC One, Friday 25 December 2009 and the film went on to receive nominations for both an Academy Award 
and a BAFTA.
It was screened in US theaters, distributed by Kidtoon Films.  In December 2012, the film and its sequel The Gruffalo's Child premiered on television in the United States on Disney Junior, and in December 2017 – 2018, the film and its sequel  premiered on television in the United States on Disney Junior the channel.

Plot
In an autumn wood, a Red squirrel mother finds a nut. Her children are playing until they see an owl. The mother squirrel drops the nut as she escapes from the owl, but her shocked children want her to tell them a story. So she tells the story of a mouse strolling through a deep dark wood.

Mouse tries to find a nut to eat but he can not reach it, so he makes a journey to a beautiful nut tree. Encountering three carnivorous animals along the way, who all wish to eat him, -- first a fox, (who wants to cook the mouse) then an owl, (which wants eat her for tea) and finally a snake (who wants to choke and eat the mouse) —the plucky mouse uses his wits to survive. He lies to each animal that he is meeting a monster (calling his imaginary beast a ‘Gruffalo’), describes his terrible features, says that he is meeting him "here", and that the Gruffalo's favourite food is whichever animal is threatening him which are roasted fox, owl ice cream, and scrambled snake. Each predator then panics and flees, but later they all gather and talk about what the mouse said, then realize they have been tricked.

Mouse feels so confident that he finally reaches the nut tree and suddenly comes face to face with a real Gruffalo, exactly as he had described it. When the Gruffalo catches and threatens to eat him, Mouse uses his wits again and says that everyone in the wood is afraid of him, asking the Gruffalo to follow him and see. As the two of them meet the animals again, the presence of the Gruffalo frightens them away: The Gruffalo believes they are afraid of the mouse. As the Gruffalo prepares to eat the mouse, Mouse's tummy rumbles and he says his favourite food is Gruffalo crumble, causing the Gruffalo to retreat in fear. Finally safe, he finds the nut from earlier, which the Gruffalo had knocked down, and can eat it in peace.

When the mother squirrel ends her story, the children feel better and they all go to retrieve their nut as snow begins to fall. In the end credits, the house of the snake is seen.

Voice cast
 Helena Bonham Carter as Mother Squirrel/Narrator
 James Corden as Mouse
 Robbie Coltrane as The Gruffalo
 Tom Wilkinson as Fox
 John Hurt as Owl
 Rob Brydon as Snake
 Sam Lewis as First Little Squirrel
 Phoebe Givron-Taylor as Second Little Squirrel

Background and production
The Gruffalo, written by Julia Donaldson and illustrated by Axel Scheffler, was published in 1999 and has sold over 5 million copies worldwide.  In a BBC Radio 2 poll in 2009, the book was voted as the UK's favourite bedtime story. The book has been adapted into a 27-minute animated film, which was broadcast on BBC One in the UK on 25 December 2009. This new version features Robbie Coltrane in the title role and James Corden as the mouse as well as Helena Bonham Carter as the mother squirrel narrator and Rob Brydon as the Snake. The production was animated at the award-winning Studio Soi in Germany and produced through Magic Light Pictures. The film also has the voices of John Hurt as the Owl and Tom Wilkinson as the Fox. It was nominated for an Academy Award for Best Short Film (Animated) on 25 January 2011. The film was also nominated for a BAFTA in 2010.

Reception
The film premiered on BBC One, Christmas Day 2009, watched by 9.8 million people. Review website Den of Geek described it as an "utterly charming piece of magic".

The film has been broadcast across the world, including on ZDF in Germany. It premiered on United States television on 9 December 2010 on ABC Family during its 25 Days of Christmas programming block. It also aired on YTV in Canada on 18 December 2011.

The Gruffalo has also been shown on Nick Jr in the UK and is distributed on DVD by Entertainment One. NCircle distribute the DVD in the US, Phase 4 in Canada and Concorde in Germany.

A Scottish Gaelic version has also been produced, with the voice of the Gruffalo provided by Bill Paterson. An Gruffalo was first shown on BBC Alba on Christmas Eve 2010.

The film has also proved a hit with festival audiences around the world. On top of its Academy Award and BAFTA nominations it has also been awarded prizes at festivals including Annecy International Animation Festival (France), Anima Mundi (Brazil), The Broadcast Awards 2011 (UK), Cartoons on the Bay (Italy), Chicago International Children's Festival (Canada), CFC Worldwide Short Film Festival (Canada), Ottawa International Animation Festival (Canada), Prix Jeunesse (Germany), Sapporo Short Fest (Japan), Shanghai Television Festival (China) and Internationales Trick Film Festival (Germany). The Gruffalo was also nominated for the prestigious Cartoon d'or 2011.

Awards and nominations

Sequel

The sequel to the Gruffalo, based on the follow-up to the picture book, was shown on BBC One on Christmas Day 2011.

See also
 Room on the Broom

References

External links
 
 The Gruffalo on BBC Online
 The Gruffalo on Magic Light Pictures

2009 films
2009 short films
2009 television films
2009 computer-animated films
2000s children's films
2000s animated short films
British children's films
British computer-animated films
British animated short films
British television films
German children's films
German computer-animated films
German animated short films
German television films
English-language German films
Donaldson and Scheffler
Animated films based on children's books
Films about mice and rats
Animated films about foxes
Films about owls
Films about snakes
Animated films about squirrels
Films set in forests
BBC Film films
Films directed by Max Lang
Fiction about monsters
2000s British films
2000s German films
ZDF original programming